Sérgio Yoshio Sasaki Júnior (born March 31, 1992) is a Brazilian male artistic gymnast. He has collected a career tally of sixteen medals (six gold, eight silver, and two bronze) in a major international competition, spanning the Pan American Games, the Pan American Championships, and the South American Games. Sasaki also attended two editions of the Summer Olympic Games (2012 and 2016), as a member of the national team.

References

External links

 
 
 
 

1992 births
Living people
Brazilian male artistic gymnasts
Place of birth missing (living people)
Gymnasts at the 2012 Summer Olympics
Gymnasts at the 2016 Summer Olympics
Olympic gymnasts of Brazil
Gymnasts at the 2011 Pan American Games
Pan American Games gold medalists for Brazil
Brazilian people of Japanese descent
Pan American Games medalists in gymnastics
South American Games gold medalists for Brazil
South American Games silver medalists for Brazil
South American Games medalists in gymnastics
Competitors at the 2010 South American Games
Competitors at the 2014 South American Games
Medalists at the 2011 Pan American Games
Originators of elements in artistic gymnastics
People from São Bernardo do Campo
Sportspeople from São Paulo (state)
21st-century Brazilian people